DJ Will Gill is an American DJ and personality. He appeared as a cast member on The Real World: Hollywood, the twentieth season of MTV's long-running reality television series, The Real World.

Life and career 
DJ Will Gill was born William Gilbert in Detroit, Michigan. He studied sound engineering and music production at the Recording Institute of Detroit and attended Michigan State University while studying advertising.

During taping of The Real World, DJ Will Gill produced music and wrote songs alongside housemate Brianna Taylor. The two travelled to Philadelphia to resolve Taylor's legal troubles.

In 2008, DJ Will Gill headlined as a DJ at MGM Grand Casino in Detroit, Michigan.

Television work 
 The Real World: Hollywood (MTV; 2008) Himself 
 The Voice (NBC; 2017–2019) DJ
 The Kelly Clarkson Show  (NBC; 2019–2020) DJ

Parodies, derivatives, and references 
In the TV series Happy Endings, the fourth episode of the third season titled "More Like Stanksgiving" showed the characters watching clips from an episode of The Real World: Sacramento, on which they themselves were previously cast members. The character Brad Williams, played by actor Damon Wayans Jr., parodied DJ Will Gill, mimicking Gill's hair and wearing of long-sleeved shirts underneath T-shirts as seen on The Real World: Hollywood. The fictional season was said to have not aired due to one of the cast members burning down the house.

See also 
 List of The Real World cast members

References

External links 
 
 The Real World Official Site
 Parodic Visual
The Virtual MCs Charged With Saving Company Morale in 2020

Living people
African-American people
The Real World (TV series) cast members
Year of birth missing (living people)